Koposov 1 is a low-luminosity globular cluster in the constellation Virgo in the halo of the Milky Way galaxy. It was discovered, along with globular cluster Koposov 2 by S. Koposov et al. in 2007. Koposov 1 and Koposov 2 were described by their discoverers as the "lowest luminosity globular clusters orbiting the Milky Way," along with AM 4, Palomar 1, and Whiting 1.

References

Globular clusters
Virgo (constellation)
Astronomical objects discovered in 2007